Myxoderma is a genus of sea stars belonging to the family Zoroasteridae.

The species of this genus are found on the coasts of Pacific Ocean.

Species:
 Myxoderma acutibrachia Aziz & Jangoux, 1984 
 Myxoderma longispinum (Ludwig, 1905)

References

Forcipulatida
Asteroidea genera